Berdu (also Romanized as Berdū and Bardū) is a village in Karizan Rural District, Nasrabad District, Torbat-e Jam County, Razavi Khorasan Province, Iran. At the 2006 census, its population was 525, in 131 families.

References 

Populated places in Torbat-e Jam County